Ouled Antar is a town and commune in Médéa Province, Algeria. It had a population of 2,216 as of 2008.

References

Communes of Médéa Province
Cities in Algeria
Algeria